The man on the Bondi tram is a fictional legal character used in civil law in New South Wales, Australia, representing an ordinary person. Jurors, for example, have been directed to consider what the man on the Bondi tram would think of whether a statement is defamatory. The phrase borrows from the English formulation of the 'man on the Clapham omnibus', who personifies an average, reasonable person. It is comparable to the phrase 'the man in the street'.

Government trams were discontinued in Sydney in the 1960s, to be replaced by buses.

References 

Legal fictions
Law of Australia
Australian English
Placeholder names